Meshkin (also Romanized as Meshkīn; also known as Meshgīn and Mushkin) is a village in Qareh Poshtelu-e Bala Rural District of Qareh Poshtelu District of Zanjan County, Zanjan province, Iran. At the 2006 National Census, its population was 1,321 in 285 households. The following census in 2011 counted 1,280 people in 324 households. The latest census in 2016 showed a population of 1,264 people in 366 households; it was the largest village in its rural district.

References 

Zanjan County

Populated places in Zanjan Province

Populated places in Zanjan County